The 1998 World Junior Figure Skating Championships were held in Saint John, New Brunswick, Canada between November 30 and December 7, 1997. Younger figure skaters competed for the title of World Junior Champion.

Medals table

Results

Men

Ladies

Pairs

Ice dancing

References

External links
 skatabase
 other info

World Junior Figure Skating Championships
1997 in figure skating
F
World Junior 1998